Germany's Next Topmodel, cycle 14 is the fourteenth cycle of Germany's Next Topmodel. It aired on ProSieben in February to May 2019.

The prizes including a modeling contract worth €140,000 with ONEeins fab Management, a spread and cover in the German Harper's Bazaar, a €100,000 cash prize, a campaign for Michael Michalsky's parfum and for Palmolive.

For this season, there is no jury. Thomas Hayo and Michael Michalsky are not returning for their spots as judges, whilst the teams and battle concept are removed as well.

The international destinations this cycle are Sölden, Los Angeles, New York, Miami, Amsterdam and Paris.

The winner of this season was 21-year-old Simone Kowalski from Stade.

Contestants
(ages stated are at start of contest)

Episode summaries

Episode 1: Dinner mit Heidi 
Original airdate: 

At the start of the new season, Heidi Klum met her Top 50 model contenders for a glittering dinner in Berlin. Then, she revealed that the girls have to walk in their first fashion show for designer Michael Michalsky. After the show, 30 girls got chosen.

Wildcard: Marlene Donner
Special guest: Lena Gercke

Episode 2: Schneeköniginnen 
Original airdate: 

Heidi Klum traveled with her 30 finalists to Sölden, Austria. Then, the girls had their first challenge. They had to compete in a shoot, in two teams and in sexy ski outfits against each other. Heidi choose Sayana and Tatjana to be the leader of their group. The prize was that the winning team would moving into a luxury hotel, whilst the losing team had to move in a rustic hut.

Names in bold represent the winner(s) in their round.

The winning team was Tatjana's team. At the first main photo shoot with Kristian Schuller, the girls turned into radiant snow queens. And fashion designer Wolfgang Joop surprised the models with a professional runway teaching for the perfect appearance on the catwalk. At elimination, Catharina was eliminated but got a wildcard from Wolfgang and was saved. In the end, Anastasiya, Ann-Kathrin, Debora and Marlene were eliminated.

Challenge winner: Team Tatjana
Wildcard: Catharina Maranca
Eliminated: Anastasiya Baskakova, Ann-Kathrin Grünewald, Debora Goulart & Marlene Donner
 Featured photographer: Kristian Schuller
Special guest: Wolfgang Joop

Episode 3: Sexy-Edition 
Original airdate: 

The new week started with a photoshoot. The girls had to pose as farm girls with Jordan Barrett. After the photoshoot, the girls had a catwalk training with Heidi. Then, the girls had to walk against each other in a challenge. Each one girl of the teams.

Names in bold represent the winner(s) in their round.

The challenge has won by Team Sayana (Team Hütte). At elimination, Joelle was eliminated but got a wildcard from  Ellen and was saved. In the end, Celine, Loriane, Maria and Naomi were eliminated.

Quit: Olivia Rhode
Challenge winner: Team Sayana
Wildcard: Joelle Juana Pascai-Quednau
Eliminated: Celine Hamann, Loriane Glocke, Maria Willhauk & Naomi Ufelle
 Featured photographer/special guest: Ellen von Unwerth

Episode 4: Social Media Edition
Original airdate: 

The girls arrived in Los Angeles. But Kim decided to quit the competition for personal reason and Jasmin couldn't fly because of problems back at home. They met with Winnie Harlow after they arrived. Winnie told the girls that they gonna be divided into 2 teams for this week's challenge. The leaders of the 2 groups were Lena and Simone. They had an Instagram challenge, where the girls had to make an Insta-story in Hollywood Boulevard.

The winning team was Team Lena. They received clothes from Levi's when they arrived into the model villa. Then, the girls had an interview training with Julia Bauer. In this week's photoshoot the girls where dressed as alien stewardesses in which they were suspended in the air. Also, all of the photo where posted on Instagram and the girl who would get the most likes for her photo would be immune from elimination. At elimination, Enisa was immune for having the most likes for her photo. In the end, Catharina, Joelle and Melina were eliminated.

Quit: Kim Dammer
Challenge winner: Team Lena
Immune: Enisa Bukvic
Eliminated: Catharina Maranca, Joelle Juana Pascai-Quednau & Melina Lucht
Featured photographer: Christian Anwander
Special guest: Julia Bauer & Winnie Harlow

Episode 5: Das große Umstyling
Original airdate: 

Jasmin had arrived in Los Angeles. But the girls were not happy about that. This week was the big makeover. But with the help and advice, the girls were assisted by guest judge and Germany's Next Topmodel, season 9 winner Stefanie Giesinger. This week's photoshoot was the sedcard shoot. At the elimination, the girls walked in dresses from designer Michael Costello. But at the end of the catwalk, the girls had also to make a speech of their love for their own reflection. In the end, Leonela was eliminated.

Eliminated: Leonela Hires
Featured photographer: Max Montgomery
Special guest: Michael Costello & Stefanie Giesinger

Episode 6: Haute Couture Edition
Original airdate: 

The week started with a casting for About You. Sayana and Simone were booked for the job. At the photoshoot, the girls had to pose in the desert and in pairs. After the shoot, the girls had a Haute couture walk training with topmodel Toni Garrn. At the elimination, Enisa, Justine, Luna and Vanessa landed in the bottom four. Enisa got a wildcard from Toni and was saved. In the end, Luna was eliminated.

Booked for job: Sayana Ranjan & Simone Kowalski 
Bottom four: Enisa Bukvic, Justine Klippenstein, Luna Dzek Dukadjinac & Vanessa Stanat
Wildcard: Enisa Bukvic
Eliminated: Luna Dzek Dukadjinac
Featured photographer: Mario Schmolka
Special guest: Toni Garrn

Episode 7: Das Nacktshooting 
Original airdate: 

The week started with a visit from supermodel Gisele Bündchen. The girls were very pleased about that. On the next day, Enisa had a panic attack and decided to quit the competition. In there next photoshoot, the girls had to pose nude with puppies. The girls also wore jewelry worth $2.5 million. After the photoshoot, Alicija was booked for a job.

In the most shocking elimination yet, Jasmin was disqualified from the competition after getting involved in a physical altercation with Lena. After Jasmin left, Heidi announced that there will be no further elimination this week and no one else would be going home.

Quit: Enisa Bukvic
Booked for job: Alicija Köhler
Bottom two: Jasmin Cadete & Lena Lischewski
Disqualified: Jasmin Cadete
Featured photographer: Rankin
Special guest: Gisele Bündchen

Episode 8: Casting Edition 
Original airdate: 

The top 13 headed to Miami this week. Then, the girls had to do a casting marathon for 5 different clients.

After the casting marathon, the girls flew back to Los Angeles. In L.A., the girls had their next photoshoot. The girls had to jump as elegantly as possible from a three-meter tower into a swimming pool with a big bag and in bikinis from Heidi's own collection. On the next day, the girls had  to walk in a fashion show for designer Christian Cowan. After that was the elimination. Julia, Melissa and Sayana landed in the bottom three. In the end, Melissa was eliminated, thus sparing Julia and Sayana.

Booked for job: Sarah Almoril, Simone Kowalski, Tatjana Wiedemann, Theresia Fischer & Vanessa Stanat
Bottom three: Julia Helm, Melissa Hemberger & Sayana Ranjan
Eliminated: Melissa Hemberger
Featured photographer: Chuck Grant
Special guest: Christian Cowan & Zara Larsson

Episode 9: We love to entertain you! 
Original airdate: 

The week started with a visit from moderator and entertainer Thomas Gottschalk. Alicija, Julia, Sarah and Vanessa were invited to a casting for 
the magazine ELLE. Alicija and Vanessa were booked for the job. In their next photoshoot, the girls had to pose in a circus with snakes. At elimination, the girls had to perform an act in front of an audience. In the end, Justine was eliminated.

Booked for job: Alicija Köhler & Vanessa Stanat
Eliminated: Justine Klippenstein
Featured photographer: Brian Bowen Smith
Special guest: Thomas Gottschalk

Episode 10: Der Einzug in die Top 10 
Original airdate: 

The week started with a dance teaching with Creative Director Thomas Hayo. The girls were also divided into 4 groups.

After that, Cäcilia and Vanessa were invited to a casting for NYLON magazine in Amsterdam. Cäcilia was booked for the job. On the next day, the girls had a video shoot inspired by John Travolta's "Saturday Night Fever". At the elimination, the girls had a David Bowie inspired fashion show. Lena and Theresia landed in the bottom two. In the end, Theresia was eliminated.

Booked for job: Cäcilia Zimmer
Bottom two: Lena Lischewski & Theresia Fischer
Eliminated: Theresia Fischer
Featured director: Lance Drake
Special guest: Thomas Hayo

Episode 11: Boys Edition 
Original airdate: 

The top 10 met with their co-partners for their next photoshoot and designer Michael Michalsky in the model villa. Michael Michalsky announced that the girls would each pose with a male model in their next photoshoot. On the next day, the girls had to pose with the male model in the rain. The girls also had a casting for John Frieda. Sarah and Simone were booked for the job. At elimination, Julia and Lena landed in the bottom two. In the end, Julia was eliminated.

Booked for job: Sarah Almoril & Simone Kowalski
Bottom two: Julia Helm & Lena Lischewski
Eliminated: Julia Helm
Featured photographer: Charlotte Rutherford
Special guest: Michael Michalsky

Episode 12: Glamour Edition 
Original airdate: 

Heidi surprised the girls with an invitation for the amfAR Gala. Cäcilia and Vanessa were chosen to fly to New York and to go to the amfAR Gala. After that, was the next big photoshoot for the girls with star photographer Yu Tsai. The girls had a foam party with It-girl Paris Hilton. On the next day, was the elimination. The girls had to walk in elegant dresses with headdresses made of balloons. Lena and Tatjana landed in the bottom two. Paris Hilton got a wildcard from Heidi and was allowed to save one of the two girls. She chose Tatjana, while Lena was eliminated.

Bottom two: Lena Lischewski & Tatjana Wiedemann
Wildcard: Tatjana Wiedemann
Eliminated: Lena Lischewski
Featured photographer: Yu Tsai
Special guest: Paris Hilton

Episode 13: Drag Edition 
Original airdate: 

The week started with dance teaching with 4 drag queens: Derrick Barry, Silky Nutmeg Ganache, Vanessa Vanjie Mateo & Nebraska Thunderfuck. After that, the girls had their next photoshoot. The girls were dressed as anime girls, while cycling a bike in the air. On the next day, the girls had a casting for Magdeburg-LosAngeles. Simone was booked for the job. At the elimination, the girls had to dance as drag queens in groups of two.

Cäcilia, Sayana & Tatjana landed in the bottom three. Cäcilia was saved, leaving Sayana and Tatjana in the bottom two. Guest judge Bill Kaulitz got a wildcard and saved Sayana. In the end, Tatjana was eliminated.

Booked for job: Simone Kowalski
Bottom three: Cäcilia Zimmer, Sayana Ranjan & Tatjana Wiedemann
Wildcard: Sayana Ranjan
Eliminated: Tatjana Wiedemann
Featured photographer: Vijat Mohindra
Special guest: Bill Kaulitz

Episode 14: Personality Edition 
Original airdate: 

The week started with a teaching with Heidi about their signature walks. On the next day, the girls had a casting for Sephora. Simone was booked for the job. After that, the girls had a body painting photoshoot on Rodeo Drive. After the shoot, Sarah was eliminated. At elimination, the girls had to show their signature walks in a fashion show in front of supermodel Naomi Campbell and photographer Matt McCabe. In the end, Caroline was eliminated.

Shoot out: Caroline Krüger & Sarah Almoril
Eliminated outside of judging panel: Sarah Almoril
Booked for job/Immune: Simone Kowalski
Eliminated: Caroline Krüger
Featured photographer: Matt McCabe
Special guests: Matt McCabe & Naomi Campbell

Episode 15: Halbfinale 
Original airdate: 

The week started with the Harper's Bazaar cover shoot. On the next day, the girls got visits from their family and friends. At the elimination, the girls had their last runway show. They wore Amato haute couture dresses. After that, Vanessa became the 1st finalist. Then, Simone became the 2nd finalist and Cäcilia became the 3rd finalist. Alicija and Sayana landed in the bottom two. In the end, Alicija was eliminated, making Sayana the 4th finalist.

At the end of the episode, it was announced that Vanessa decided to quit the competition because of personal problems - making Cäcilia, Sayana and Simone the Top 3.

Bottom two: Alicija Köhler & Sayana Ranjan
Eliminated: Alicija Köhler
Quit: Vanessa Stanat
Special guests: Kerstin Schneider & Lena Meyer-Landrut

Episode 16: Das große Finale 
Original airdate: 

The final started with a girl-power inspired fashion show. Then followed the first elimination, with Cäcilia became the first grand finalist to be eliminated. Then, Sayana and Simone had to prove again on the runway. The last task was a crowd surfing photoshoot with male models. After the final runway, Simone was declared the winner of Germany's Next Topmodel.

Final three: Cäcilia Zimmer, Sayana Ranjan & Simone Kowalski
Eliminated: Cäcilia Zimmer
Personality Award: Tatjana Wiedemann 
Final two: Sayana Ranjan & Simone Kowalski
Germany's Next Topmodel: Simone Kowalski
Featured photographer: Kristian Schuller
Special guests: Channing Tatum, Ellie Goulding, Jonas Brothers, Klaudia Giez, Taylor Swift, Thomas Gottschalk, Tokio Hotel & Tyra Banks

Summaries

 The contestant withdrew from the competition
 The contestant was immune from elimination 
 The contestant was in danger of elimination
 The contestant was in the bottom or originally eliminated from the competition but was saved by the guest judge
 The contestant was disqualified from the competition
 The contestant was eliminated outside of judging panel
 The contestant was eliminated
 The contestant won the competition

Photo shoot guide
Episode 2 photo shoot: Snow queens
Episode 3 photo shoot: Posing as farm girls with Jordan Barrett
Episode 4 photo shoot: Alien stewardesses
Episode 5 photo shoot: Sedcard
Episode 6 photo shoot: Gypsies in the desert
Episode 7 photo shoot: Nude with puppies and jewelry
Episode 8 photo shoot: Jumping from a three-meter tower in a swimsuit with a huge bag
Episode 9 photo shoot: Posing in a circus with snakes
Episode 10 video shoot: John Travolta's "Saturday Night Fever" inspired
Episode 11 photo shoot: Posing in the rain with a male model
Episode 12 photo shoot: Foam party with Paris Hilton
Episode 13 photo shoot: Anime girls on a flying bike
Episode 14 photo shoot: Body painting on Rodeo Drive
Episode 15 photo shoot: Harper's Bazaar Cover-Try
Episode 16 photo shoot: Crowd surfing

Controversies
In episode 7, there was a physical fight between contestants Jasmin Cadete and Lena Lischewski shown on Television, leading to the disqualification of Cadete. The lawyer of Lischewski sued ProSieben and the cameramen saying: "It is unacceptable that a television station films how a minor is beaten by another participant during the filming and the present camera crew does not intervene immediately, but continues to film the scene."

After Vanessa Stanat quit, ProSieben took over her official Instagram account. Shortly after, Stanat did not have access to her personal account either. Many, including Stanat herself, believe that this happened due to ProSieben being angry about her announcing her quit just a few weeks before the finale. Rebecca Mir took to Instagram to discredit Stanat, however she and ProSieben received backlash, because ProSieben shared personal information about Stanat with Mir.

In August 2022 in the wake of allegations by former participants against Germany's Next Topmodel, the winner of the 14th season, Simone Kowalski, also spoke up as she said: "Top Model is very dangerous for today's and the previous generations! Many young women have mental trauma! Heidi says she's just being the hostess, but she has a responsibility to at least face the pain and trauma that has been inflicted on many girls!". Kowalski also teamed up with America's Next Top Model contestant Lisa D'Amato to talk about her traumatic experiences with Germany's Next Topmodel. She said during the interview, that Germany’s Next Topmodel made her sick: "They took everything from me, I almost lost my family, my friends, all my money. It was inhuman - they broke me mentally. I came on the show healthy and got sick." She also said that after the show she was forced against her will to work for Heidi Klum's father. To former contestants defending the show, she says: "Good for you, but not for everyone". In her opinion, Germany's Next Topmodel should be discontinued.

In February 2023 Der Spiegel (online) gives a glimpse into the notorious gag contracts that candidates have to sign in order to be able to take part in the Heidi Klum show. According to the Hamburg lawyer Jörg Nabert, these are "illegal gag contracts". The contract binds the women to an agency for two years. A regulation that, according to Nabert, is not customary in the industry. The participants also agree that the recordings "present them in a way that they don't like themselves". According to Der Spiegel (online), the contracts say: "The contributors are aware of any burdens that may result for them". If necessary, “substantive suggestions” would be made and enforced by the show management. Germany's Next Topmodel can thus stylize people like Tessa Bergmeier (Season 4) as "bitches" without them being able to defend themselves effectively afterwards. Heidi Klum's casting show goes further than similar formats with this practice.

In February 2023, the Berliner Zeitung published an article about the show with the headline: "Why isn't Germany’s Next Topmodel actually canceled?" 

In February 2023, the German InTouch wrote: "The willingness to use violence among girls is increasing. They form gangs, bully, hit. Heidi is also partly responsible for the fact that, at least on TV, such behavior should not lead to extra airtime..." The article goes on to say: "With Germany’s Next Topmodel absolutely wrong values ​​​​are conveyed. It gives the impression that bullying is a legitimate means of dealing with each other."

In February 2023, the Neue Osnabrücker Zeitung wrote that Germany’s Next Topmodel is one of the worst trash TV programs on German television. And: "anyone who watches Heidi Klum is just as bad as she is."

In February 2023, the former judge Peyman Armin criticized the show and Heidi Klum as well. He said: "It has become a pure self-portrayal by Heidi. Heidi comes first. Then Heidi and Heidi again. When Heidi Klum is in the foreground and takes care of the slapstick, for sensational shootings and catfights." Part of the episodes are therefore always scenes in which Heidi Klum would blaspheme with jurors about the contestants.

Also in February 2023, former judge Wolfgang Joop criticized the show and Heidi Klum again when he said he had no say in the decisions. "Heidi does that. Nobody can help there." Not even the producers were allowed to have a say, apart from the timing of the direction. Joop: "Then they say something like: 'Don't let her go yet, the boyfriend will come, that'll bring a lot of tears of joy, we'll take that with us.'" He added: "I wouldn't have been surprised if the show had been discontinued."

In February 2023 at the beginning of the 18th season, Heidi Klum gave a 10-minute speech in which she denied all allegations against her and the show and blamed the candidates themselves. This was once again heavily criticized by both the viewers and the media in Germany. The Berliner Morgenpost wrote: "Everything is wrong, says Klum. She emphasized that 'everything is real' on her show. There is no text or storyline for the models. That's why it's not her fault if a young model feels misrepresented after the broadcast. 'We can only portray a person as they are,' philosophizes Klum. Whether this is true remains questionable. On the one hand, because a story can be cobbled together afterwards that doesn't have to have anything to do with reality. On the other hand, because in the show very young girls in absolutely exceptional and stressful situations meet experienced editors who know exactly what the viewers later want to see on television." Die Welt called Heidi Klum's statement "bizarre". Frankfurter Allgemeine called it a "Catwalk of Shame". Web.de headlined: "Why Heidi Klum's statement is dishonest". Annabelle (magazine) (Switzerland) headlined: "Heidi Klum, this justification went wrong". In an article, Puls24 (Austria) asked whether Heidi Klum practiced perpetrator-victim reversal and Gaslighting. Frankfurter Allgemeine headlined: "This woman only has dollar signs in her eyes" and also assumed that Heidi Klum was doing a perpetrator-victim reversal. BILD asked: "How evil is Heidi Klum really?".

In March 2023 former judge Peyman Armin apologized to Lijana Kaggwa for what she had to experience on Germany's Next Topmodel. He also apologized for being part of Germany's Next Topmodel and promised to never take part in the show again. All of this was broadcast in the format "13 questions" on ZDF.

References

External links 
Official Website

2019 German television seasons
Germany's Next Topmodel
Television shows filmed in Austria
Television shows filmed in Los Angeles
Television shows filmed in New York City
Television shows filmed in Miami
Television shows filmed in the Netherlands
Television shows filmed in France